The 59th British Academy Film Awards, given by the British Academy of Film and Television Arts, took place on 19 February 2006 and honoured the best films of 2005.

Brokeback Mountain won Best Film, Best Director for Ang Lee, Best Supporting Actor for Jake Gyllenhaal, and Best Adapted Screenplay. Philip Seymour Hoffman won Best Actor for Capote and Reese Witherspoon won Best Actress for Walk the Line. The Constant Gardener received the most nominations with 10; the film only received one award: Best Editing for Claire Simpson. Wallace & Gromit: The Curse of the Were-Rabbit, directed by Nick Park and Steve Box, was voted Outstanding British Film of 2005.

Winners and nominees

Statistics

See also
 78th Academy Awards
 31st César Awards
 11th Critics' Choice Awards
 58th Directors Guild of America Awards
 19th European Film Awards
 63rd Golden Globe Awards
 26th Golden Raspberry Awards
 20th Goya Awards
 21st Independent Spirit Awards
 11th Lumières Awards
 17th Producers Guild of America Awards
 10th Satellite Awards
 32nd Saturn Awards
 12th Screen Actors Guild Awards
 58th Writers Guild of America Awards

Notes

References

External links
 

Film059
B
2006 in British cinema
February 2006 events in the United Kingdom
2006 in London
2005 awards in the United Kingdom